Museum Voorlinden is an art museum in Wassenaar in the Netherlands. It was founded and is privately owned by Joop van Caldenborgh. It was opened on 10 September 2016 by King Willem-Alexander of the Netherlands.

References

External links 
 Museum Voorlinden, official website
 

2016 establishments in the Netherlands
Museums established in 2016
Museums in South Holland
Wassenaar
21st-century architecture in the Netherlands